Adukkala Rahasyam Angaadi Paattu is a 1997 Indian Malayalam-language film directed by Nissar. The film stars Vijayaraghavan, Geetha, Jagathy Sreekumar and Cochin Haneefa in the lead roles. The film has musical score by Wilson.

Cast
Vijayaraghavan as  Josekutty
Geetha as Lilly
Jagathy Sreekumar as Kaimal
Ponnamma Babu as Indira Kaimal
Cochin Haneefa as Dr. Paul
Kanakalatha as Meena Paul
Tony as Nixon
Usha as Jenna
Nadirsha as Alex
Sukumari
Philomina
Chandni Shaju as Annie
Baburaj as Adv. Babu Thomas
Adoor Pankajam as Karimeli
Machan Varghese as Chandikunju

Soundtrack
The music was composed by Wilson Skemurak and the lyrics were written by Bichu Thirumala.

References

External links
 

1997 films
1990s Malayalam-language films
Films directed by Nissar